Die Kommissarin (Lady Cop) is a German police TV series which aired on Das Erste. Its 66 episodes ran from 1994 till 2006.

The series, which takes place in Frankfurt am Main, Germany, is notable as being the first, and as one of the most successful, German police detective series with a female lead character (others include Bella Block and Rosa Roth).

The main character is Inspector Lea Sommer, played by Hannelore Elsner. Sommer is divorced with custody of her teenage son, Daniel. She is looking forward to a new relationship with her new boyfriend, Jonathan. Although Lea and Jonathan telephone each other frequently, he is never seen or heard on screen (see unseen character).

Sommer was originally paired with Nick Siegel (Til Schweiger), but in a 1996 episode, Siegel was shot to death by an escaping criminal. His last words were "Lea, ich fühle mich so kalt" ("Lea, I feel so cold"). Sommer's current partner officer is Jan Orlop.

Die Kommissarin airs on the German Language channel German Kino Plus in the United States. In Finland it airs on Yle TV2 under the title Etsivä Lea Sommer. (Detective Lea Sommer)

See also
 Der Kommissar (TV series)

External links
 

German crime television series
German drama television series
1994 German television series debuts
2006 German television series endings
Television shows set in Frankfurt
German-language television shows
Das Erste original programming
1990s German police procedural television series
2000s German police procedural television series